Forrest is a small rural township  in the Otway Ranges, Victoria, Australia.  At the 2016 census, Forrest and the surrounding area had a population of 230.

History
The History of Forrest started more than 40,000 years ago. Forrest is at the northern end of the Otway Ranges.
Historically, the Otway Ranges are the land of the Gadubanud people. The current boundaries of  the Otway Shire Council partially include land belonging to the tribes of Gadubanud people and Gulidjan.
Niewójt (2009) attempted to reconstruct the cultural landscape created by the Gadubanud people prior to their disastrous encounter with Europeans in the late 1840s.
The vast territory (Figure 1)  stretching from Painkalac Creek (near Aireys Inlet) in the east to the Gellibrand River that flows west of the mountains is over 100 kilometres. Niewójt (2009) noted that food supply through the coastline yielding shellfish, the presence of several wetlands and productive estuaries, and the plant foods available both in open land and potentially acquired through trade with neighbouring groups. This lead him to deduct that the archaeological record, historic coastal survey maps and assessment of regional food resources suggest that the pre-contact population of the Gadubanud was far larger than indicated in the documentary record. The existence of a sophisticated resource management regime and movement corridors were maintained through the selective deployment of fire to generate a specific type of landscape mosaic.
Wetlands, such as those found near the outlets of the Gellibrand and Aire rivers, provided a fine variety of foods. Fish, eels, waterfowl and bird's eggs added much protein to the diet yet responded to  exploitation with a high rate of annual regeneration. In the region's lakes and wetlands, particularly  those at Gerangamete, Irrewillipe and Chapple Vale, food was reliable and easily accessed.

Hemmed in by a rising ocean that stabilised about 7000 years ago, the uplifted sedimentary rocks of the Otway Range run from north-east to south-west at an elevation of about 500 metres above the sea. A few isolated peaks reach up to 675 metres, and at many points along this coastline bare mountains and tree-clad ridges plummet dramatically into the sea. In the north, the narrow belt of foothills merge with the undulating volcanic plain that is the definitive feature of Victoria's Western District. Littoral plains are found only at Apollo Bay and further west, but even these flat stretches of coastal terrain do not exceed five kilometres in width. Vegetation within the traditional territory of the Gadubanud people varies from heath on the sea cliffs, to dunes near the Cape, open forest on the eastern slope, wet sclerophyll forest in the mountains and tracts of rainforest along some watercourses and mountain gullies (see Fig 1). Highly productive ecosystems, such as the wetlands found at the base of the northern foothills (at the headwaters of the Barwon River) and the numerous river estuaries of the coastal zone, provided a vast food supply and a range of options regarding the seasonal sequence, frequency and intensity of harvesting.

White Settlement
The railway to the town was opened in 1891 and closed in 1957, as a branch line from Birregurra. It serviced the townships of Deans Marsh, Murroon, Barwon Downs, Yaugher and Forrest. At Forrest numerous tramways ran off into the nearby bush. These lines were used to bring the freshly cut timber to the rail head, and the associated sawmills of which there were 4 in Forrest and nearby Yaugher. All of these mills are now closed.

Originally called Yaugher, the name was changed to Forrest when the township was established. Forrest was named after Charles Lamond Forrest, the Colonial Government MLA representative for the district, who pushed for the rail link to be made. The railway station was opened as Yaugher on 5 June 1891 but renamed to Forrest on 21 September 1891. The Post Office also opened as Yaugher on 27 July 1891 and was also renamed Forrest a few weeks later on 15 October 1891.

The town football team was established in 1891 and competed in the Colac & District Football League until 2015, eventually folding after struggling to field netball and junior football teams due to lack of available players in the district.

Today
Consisting of a general store, upmarket restaurant, "pub", guesthouse and a variety of accommodation rentals, Forrest is the gateway to the Otway Ranges.  It is fast becoming a hub for foodies and adventure tourists, which is now the primary economic driver of the town. The West Barwon river flows through the township and it is near the West Barwon reservoir, which services Geelong.

During the past few years the town has begun to grow again with an influx of people seeking more affordable blocks of land not that far away from the coastal resorts of Apollo Bay, Skenes Creek, Grey River, Kennett River and Lorne. These can be reached either by a pleasant drive on a sealed main road or by ex-timber blue metal roads. Advice should be sought before motoring on the backroads to Kennett River, Wye River and Grey River.

Fauna to be viewed on these drives include Australian king parrots, crimson rosellas, grey swamp wallabies, echidnas.  Koalas have in the past been released into the Otways.  
The Smith Street Band recorded their third album Throw Me in the River in Forrest in July 2014.

Mountain biking
After the cessation of logging in the Otways, the Government of Victoria made funds available for the creation of dedicated Mountain bike trails in the Yaugher area, in order to replace the logging industry. Mountain biking was seen as an addition to the already plentiful eco-tourism industry. Mountain biking now makes up a large portion of the economy in Forrest. Further details can be found at the official website www.rideforrest.com.au

Forrest is home to the following annual Mountain Bike Events
 Forrest Festival - 2 day multi stage event
 Otway Odyssey - 100k event
 Forrest 6 Hour - 6 Hour event by teams and individuals

References

External links

Towns in Victoria (Australia)
Otway Ranges